Pauline Small (November 30, 1924 – March 9, 2005) was the first woman to be elected to office in the Crow Tribe of Indians.  In 1966 she was elected to Vice-Secretary of the Crow Tribal Council, holding office de facto to 1972, and served in various positions within the Crow Tribal Offices, many to do with supporting education.

Early life and education
Pauline White Man Runs Him was born on the Crow Indian Reservation in Lodge Grass, Montana.  The youngest of three children, she was raised in the Valley of the Chiefs district on the reservation.  Small was a granddaughter of White Man Runs Him.

Marriage and family
She married Ivan James Small, Sr., a member of the Northern Cheyenne Tribe of Indians.  They made their home in Busby, Montana.  Eventually they moved to the family allotment of Packs The Hat in the Rotten Grass area.

Tribal politics
Small was active in Crow tribal politics.  In 1966 she was elected to the position of Vice-Secretary of the Tribal Council, the first woman to hold any office. She served in that position until 1972, and has been active on various committees of the Tribal council.

Deeply interested in education, she was a member of the Lodge Grass Board of Trustees, serving as Chair for eight years; Crow Tribal Education Committee; and the 107th Committee of the Crow Tribal Council.  A member of the Crow Nation, she was very involved with tribal government. Small was an active supporter of Indian rodeo for 30 years.

References

External links 
 —Article about Pauline Small's support for Indian rodeo
 The Minneapolist Institute of Arts—Quote from Pauline Small

1924 births
2005 deaths
Crow tribe
Female Native American leaders
Haskell Indian Nations University alumni
20th-century American politicians
20th-century American women politicians
People from Lodge Grass, Montana
20th-century Native American women
20th-century Native Americans
21st-century Native American women
21st-century Native Americans
Native American women in politics